The G. Robert Cotton Correctional Facility is a state prison for men located in Jackson, Jackson County, Michigan, owned and operated by the Michigan Department of Corrections.  

This facility dates from 1985.  Cotton, which is an inmate educational facility, is one portion of the former Michigan State Prison, described as the largest walled prison in the world as late as 1981, when it was rocked by extensive, damaging riots.    The prison was divided in 1988 into smaller institutions.  As of 2016, Cotton and three other components remain open:  

 the Parnall Correctional Facility, a minimum security prison 
 the Charles Egeler Reception and Guidance Center, an intake and processing facility for all male state prisoners
 the Cooper Street Correctional Facility, a discharge and processing facility

References

Prisons in Michigan
Buildings and structures in Jackson County, Michigan
1985 establishments in Michigan